Buíque is a Brazilian municipality in the state of Pernambuco, mesoregion of Agreste. It has an estimated population of 58,919 in a total area of 1345,1 km2. The Kapinawá Indigenous Reserve is located in the municipality of Buíque.

History
The municipality of Buíque was settled in 1752, and was originally known as Campos de Buíque. The name "Buíque" comes from Tupi and means "Place of Snakes". Buíque became a village in 1854 and a city in 1874.

The writer Graciliano Ramos grew up in Buíque.  At age 18, Graciliano wrote to this mother: "This is as the devil likes it: one wakes up at five in the morning and spends the day reading, smoking, eating and praying; one sleeps at nine in the evening. The life of an angel."

Geography
It is located at latitude 08º37'23" south and longitude 37º09'21" west, 798 meters above sea level, and 278 km from Pernambuco's state capital, Recife.

The Catimbau Valley or Vale do Catimbau in Portuguese, Brazil's second largest archeological site, is located in Buíque. Among its attractions are beautiful canyons, over 2,000 caves, and 28 registered areas with prehistoric cave paintings. The Brazilian federal government has listed the valley as a Unit of Integral Conservation and Preservation.

 State – Pernambuco
 Region – Agreste of Pernambuco
 Boundaries – Arcoverde and Sertânia (N); Águas Belas (S); Pedra (E); Tupanatinga and Itaíba (W)
 Area – 1345.1 km2
 Elevation – 798 m
 Hydrography – Ipanema and Moxotó rivers
 Vegetation – Subcaducifólia forest
 Clima – semi-arid – hot and dry
 Annual average temperature – 21.5 c
 Distance to Recife – 278 km

Economy
The main economic activities in Buique are based in general commerce, some eco-tourism and agribusiness, especially plantations of cashew nuts, manioc, and beans, and the farming of cattle, sheep and goats.

Economic indicators

Economy by sector
2006

Health indicators

References

Municipalities in Pernambuco
Populated places established in 1752
1750s establishments in Brazil
1752 establishments in South America